York Community Stadium (known for sponsorship purposes as the LNER Community Stadium) is a multi-purpose stadium in Huntington, York, England. It is owned by City of York Council, and is shared by York City Football Club and York City Knights Rugby League Football Club. The capacity of the all-seater stadium is 8,500.

The move to a new stadium was necessitated by the terms of the loan York City secured from the Football Stadia Improvement Fund to purchase their Bootham Crescent ground. Planning permission for the current design, put forward by Greenwich Leisure, was granted in March 2015. After several delays, construction began in December 2017 and was completed in December 2020. In addition to the stadium, the site houses a leisure complex and a community hub.

The opening match at the LNER Community Stadium saw York City take on AFC Fylde on 16 February 2021, which ended in a 3–1 victory for Fylde, with Alex Whitmore scoring the opening goal at the stadium. The stadium hosted both women's semi-finals of the 2021 Rugby League World Cup.

Background
York City F.C. ceased ownership of their Bootham Crescent ground in the summer of 1999, after the club's real property assets were transferred to a holding company called Bootham Crescent Holdings. The club secured a £2 million loan from the Football Stadia Improvement Fund (FSIF) to buy the ground in February 2004. The terms of this loan required the club to identify a site for a new stadium by 2007, and have detailed planning permission by 2009, to avoid financial penalties. Once plans for a new stadium were in place, the loan would turn into a grant to assist in funding the relocation.

As part of the loan agreement, Persimmon had first refusal on purchasing Bootham Crescent once York City left, for 10% lower than its market value. Persimmon intended to build 93 homes on the site, and the proceeds of the sale would go towards building the new stadium. In March 2008, York City's managing director Jason McGill cited "the annual cost of £60,000 for the maintenance and upkeep of a 1932 stadium with few commercial and income-generating opportunities" as the reason for the continued need to move to a new stadium.

Planning history
York City had identified a preferred site for a new stadium by April 2007, but were unable to disclose the location due to confidentiality clauses. Despite the club failing to formally identify a site by the end of 2007, financial penalties were not incurred, as the FSIF were satisfied with the progress made. However, McGill said plans with the preferred site had stalled by March 2008. City of York Council announced its commitment to building a community stadium in May 2008, which would be used by York City and the city's rugby league club, York City Knights.

A project board was established in January 2009, with the objective of ensuring the stadium be built by 2012. City councillors approved the outline business case for the stadium in June 2009, meaning officials could start searching for sites. Four sites were put forward to the council in June 2010, and York City favoured the option of building a 6,000 all-seater stadium at Monks Cross in Huntington, to the north of York, on the site of Huntington Stadium, which would be ready by 2014 at the earliest. Mark Stead of The Press noted the advantages of this site, including the potential for land value to include, the opportunity to build health and fitness facilities and commercial interest, and the disadvantages, including a scheduled ancient monument being located on adjacent land and traffic concerns. In July 2010, this location was chosen by the council executive as their preferred option.

Developers Oakgate (Monks Cross) Ltd submitted a planning application for a community stadium, for use by York City and York City Knights, and a retail park in September 2011. The council granted planning permission for the development in May 2012, with the stadium expected to be ready during the 2014–15 season. Gavin Aitchison of The Press commented that "one of York's biggest planning controversies in years finally came to a head" after the planning committee meeting that lasted over eight hours. Critics argued the development would damage the city centre economy, with a report by Deloitte saying the development would cost the city centre £50 million a year. In November 2012, construction was delayed until June 2014, for a completion date of July 2015. A delay to the construction of the shopping park in June 2013, caused by the discovery of protected great crested newts at the site, meant the stadium completion date was moved to January 2016.

In August 2014, Greenwich Leisure (GLL) were named as the council's preferred bidder to deliver an 8,000 all-seater stadium, to be shared by York City and York City Knights, and a leisure complex and a community hub. Construction was due to start during spring 2015, for a completion date of July 2016. York City were given responsibility for operating and managing the stadium on an initial 13-year contract. A planning application for the GLL plan was submitted to the council in December 2014, which was passed in March 2015. The cost of the stadium and leisure complex, including a replacement athletics track at another site, stood at £37 million.

In July 2015, construction was delayed as contracts were still being finalised, and the completion date was moved to during the 2016–17 season. Construction was delayed again a month later, with work to begin in February or March 2016, for completion in April or May 2017. With construction costs increasing due to more detailed design work, construction inflation and delays, the council pledged an additional £7.2 million in March 2016, raising the total cost of the project to £44.2 million. Construction was delayed to the summer of 2016, for completion in early 2018.

A judicial review of the development was launched in October 2016 by Vue Cinemas, who objected to an extra screen being approved at the site. Later that year, principal contractor ISG withdrew, citing rising costs and the judicial review, which was settled in the City of York's favour in January 2017. By May that year, construction had not yet begun nor had a new contractor been found. In November, the council stated that work would begin on the stadium before the end of the year, to be opened for the 2019–20 season. Construction began on 4 December 2017. After a number of delays, the stadium was completed and handed to the operators GLL in December 2020.

Structure and facilities
The stadium has an all-seated capacity of 8,500. It comprises four stands; the East Stand (Main Stand), the West Stand, the North Stand and the South Stand. The three-floored East Stand accommodates hospitality guests, players, officials and the media, and is connected to the adjacent retail and community facilities. The stands stretch the length of the playing field, and each corner hosts stadium facilities, including matchday emergency services, stewarding, groundsman accommodation, plant space and a fan zone. The seats are coloured red, white, yellow and blue, a combination of the colours of both teams.

The pitch uses reinforced natural grass, with provision to counter frost.

Adjoining the stadium is the leisure complex, which includes a 25-metre, six-lane swimming pool, a sports hall for netball, badminton and basketball, a gym with dance and spinning studios, an adventure sports zone and three 3G five-a-side pitches. A community hub houses health and well-being services for York residents and visitors, including clinical services, an independent living assessment centre and a library.

Mural 
In 2021, a large mural was painted on the West Stand depicting Clifford's Tower, the York city walls, York Minster, York City F.C. players, York City Knights players, and an "Azuma" train. It was designed by the University of York.

Transport
Regular bus services serve the stadium from the city centre, and additional services to other areas will be considered if there is sufficient demand. A review of the park and ride operating times will take place, with an extension to the service to be sought. On matchdays, 400 car parking places and 355 cycle parking places are available at the stadium. A cycle route exists between the site and the city centre.

Attendances

International matches
York Community Stadium was selected as the venue for the Group B matches and the semi-finals of the 2021 Women's Rugby League World Cup.

References

External links

Official website

York City F.C.
York City Knights
Proposed football venues in England
Sports venues in York
Multi-purpose stadiums in the United Kingdom